The Ngezi River is a river in central Zimbabwe.

It is a tributary of the Sebakwe River, in the Zambezi River basin.

It supplies water for the Munyati power station.

See also

Rivers of Zimbabwe
Tributaries of the Zambezi River